Pauls Kalniņš (3 March 1872, in Vilce Parish – 26 August 1945, in Lustenau, Austria) was a Latvian physician and politician (LSDSP), a long-term Speaker of the Saeima, one of the signatories of the Memorandum of the Central Council of Latvia in 17 March 1944, and was the Acting President of Latvia (1927, 1944–1945).

Personal life 
Pauls Kalniņš was born on 3 March 1872 (from other sources – 3 April) at the Vilce Parish "Mazpečuļos" as a farmer's son. After graduating from the local parish school, he studied at Liepāja Gymnasium, where he met such later statesmen such as Miķelis Valters and Jānis Jansons-Brauns. He graduated from the gymnasium in 1892 and went to study natural sciences at Moscow University, but later moved to the University of Tartu, where he studied medicine, obtaining a medical degree as a Doctor of Medicine in 1898. He met his wife, Klāra Kalniņa, in 1895, and married her three years after.

Political career 
As a member of the Pīkalkalonia, in 1897, he was arrested together with other members of the New Current and deported from Latvia until 1901. The deportation was accompanied by Žagarė. After returning to Latvia, he became a prominent member of the Social Democrats, a participant in the 1905 Russian Revolution, and was a collaborator in the editorial staff of Cīņa and Neatkarīgā Cīņa (now Neatkarīgā Rīta Avīze). He joined the non-Bolshevik direction of social democracy. He became a Chairman of the LSDSP Central Committee (1918–1924), a member of the People's Council, a member of the Constitutional Assembly and a member of all the first free state Saeima, as a Chairman of the 1st, 2nd, 3rd and 4th Saeima. According to K. Ulmanis, he spent 4 months in prison after the coup. According to the Constitution of Latvia, as the last Speaker of the Saeima, he was the acting president until his death. For this and other reasons, during the German occupation, Kalniņš was one of the founders of the Latvian Central Council.

Kalniņš ran in the Latvian presidential elections of 1930 and 1933. On both occasions, he lost to Alberts Kviesis. Kalniņš received the Order of the Three Stars 1st (1927) and 2nd Class (1926).

At the meeting of the Central Council of Latvia on 8 September 1944, Kalniņš signed a declaration on the restoration of the Latvian state: "On the basis of the Satversme of the Republic of Latvia (Article 52), the position of the last President of the Saeima has passed to me as the last legally elected Speaker of the Saeima. On this day, I took up the position of the President until the election of a new President in accordance with the procedure provided for in the Satversme. [..] "

Death 
In 1944 he emigrated. He died on 26 August 1945 in the village of Becava near Lustenava, in the Allied occupied Austria.

He was survived by his wife Klāra Kalniņa and son Brūno Kalniņš, who were also notable employees of the Social Democrats.

References 

1872 births
1945 deaths
People from Jelgava Municipality
People from Courland Governorate
Latvian Social Democratic Workers' Party politicians
Presidents of Latvia
Speakers of the Saeima
Members of the People's Council of Latvia
Deputies of the Constitutional Assembly of Latvia
Deputies of the 1st Saeima
Deputies of the 2nd Saeima
Deputies of the 3rd Saeima
Deputies of the 4th Saeima
Latvian physicians
University of Tartu alumni
Recipients of the Order of the Three Stars
Latvian World War II refugees
Latvian expatriates in Austria